The 2003 United States Federal Budget began as a proposal by President George W. Bush to fund government operations for October 1, 2002 – September 30, 2003.
The requested budget was submitted to the 107th Congress on February 4, 2002.

Total Receipts

Receipts by source: (in billions of dollars)

Total Outlays
Outlays by budget function
(in millions)

References

External links
 Status of Appropriations Legislation for Fiscal Year 2003

2003
2003 in American politics
United States federal budget